William Stephens (14 April 1870 – 14 July 1954) was a New Zealand cricketer. He played five first-class matches for Auckland between 1899 and 1901.

See also
 List of Auckland representative cricketers

References

External links
 

1870 births
1954 deaths
New Zealand cricketers
Auckland cricketers
Cricketers from Pennsylvania